This is a list of active United States Navy aircraft squadrons. Deactivated or disestablished squadrons are listed in the List of inactive United States Navy aircraft squadrons.

Navy aircraft squadrons are composed of several aircraft (from as few as about four to as many as about a dozen), the officers who fly them, the officers and sailors who maintain them and administrative support officers and sailors. Some of the units listed in this article are not designated as "squadrons", but they all operate U.S. Navy aircraft in some capacity.

Squadrons and their history are listed in the Dictionary of American Naval Aviation Squadrons (DANAS).

Squadron organization

Active duty squadrons are commanded by a commanding officer (CO) who holds the rank of commander. Second in command is the executive officer (XO), who also holds the rank of commander. The XO typically assumes command of the squadron after approximately 15 months. There are typically four functional departments – Operations, Maintenance, Safety/NATOPS, and Administration – each led by a lieutenant commander functioning as the department head. Within the departments are divisions (each typically headed by a lieutenant) and branches (headed by a lieutenant, junior grade or a chief petty officer).

The CO of a Reserve squadron is also a commander, as is the XO who will also assume command after approximately 15 months.  However, reserve squadron demographics are typically older and more senior in rank than their active duty squadron counterparts.  Department heads in reserve squadrons are typically senior lieutenant commanders, although some may be recently promoted commanders.  Where this difference in maturity level becomes more apparent is at the division officer level.  Since most officers in reserve squadrons previously served on active duty in the Regular Navy in a flying status for eight to ten or more years, they are typically already lieutenant commanders, or achieve that rank shortly after transferring to the Navy Reserve.  As a result, lieutenants are a minority and lieutenants, junior grade, are practically non-existent in reserve squadrons.  As a result, divisions are typically headed by lieutenant commanders and branches by lieutenants, senior chief petty officers or chief petty officers.

Types of squadrons
Squadrons can be categorized in a number of ways: Active versus Navy Reserve, land-based versus sea-based, fixed wing versus rotary wing (helicopter) versus Unmanned aerial vehicle (UAV), and by mission. Unlike the USAF, US Army, and USMC, the US Navy does not refer to organizations such as maintenance (though US Navy aircraft squadrons do include their own organic maintenance departments), medical, administrative or other units as "squadrons". In the US Navy a squadron is a unit of aircraft, ships, submarines or boats. There are two exceptions: Tactical Air Control Squadrons (TACRON) consists of personnel specialized in the control of aircraft in support of amphibious operations; and the operating units of Naval Special Warfare Development Group colloquially known as "SEAL Team SIX", are called "squadrons" named by color (these squadrons are the organizational equivalent of a "regular" SEAL Team). This article concerns US Navy aircraft squadrons.

Active squadrons are those in the regular US Navy. Reserve squadrons are in the US Navy Reserve and are manned by a combination of full-time and part-time reservists. For the most part, there is no way to know by the squadron's name alone whether it is an active or reserve squadron. There are Reserve elements of many Active squadrons, and active duty personnel serving in many Reserve squadrons. In general, reserve squadrons share the same missions as their active counterparts, although there are Reserve missions (e.g., Adversary and Fleet Logistics Support) that have no Active counterpart.

At any one time, the US Navy has approximately 600 aircraft that are associated with particular ships. There are also several thousand additional Navy aircraft that are capable of shipboard operations, but are not associated with a ship. The Navy also has several hundred land-based aircraft that are not capable of shipboard operations.

Squadron designations
Navy aircraft squadrons can be properly referred to by designation or nickname. A squadron's designation describes its mission and therefore generally the  type of aircraft it flies.
 The Formal form designation (e.g., Strike Fighter Squadron EIGHT SIX) indicates the mission.
 A subset of the formal form designation is a Navy acronym format in capital letters, e.g., STKFITRON EIGHT SIX
 The abbreviated designation (e.g., VFA-86) also indicates the type and mission, as each of the letters has a meaning. In this case, "V" stands for fixed wing, "F" stands for fighter, and "A" stands for attack.
 Nickname – e.g., "Sidewinders".

Note: The presence of an "M" after the "V" (or "H" in the case of a helicopter squadron) denotes a USMC squadron: i.e. VMFA, VMR, HMLA.

A single squadron can carry a number of designations through its existence.  Chief Of Naval Operations Instruction (OPNAVINST) 5030.4G governs the squadron designation system.  A squadron comes into existence when it is "established". Upon establishment it receives a designation, for example Patrol Squadron ONE or "VP-1". During the life of the squadron it may be "redesignated" one or more times, the Navy's oldest currently active squadron is VFA-14 and it has been redesignated 15 times since it was established in 1919. Over the history of U. S. Naval Aviation there have been many designations which have been used multiple times (re-used) resulting in multiple unrelated squadrons bearing the same designation at different times. A full description of the history and use of aircraft squadron designations along with the rules governing the lineages of U. S. Navy aircraft squadrons can be found at List of Inactive United States Navy aircraft squadrons.

Fixed Wing Squadrons
Navy fixed wing squadron designations start with the letter "V" because in 1920 with issuance of General Order 541, two overall types of aircraft were identified and assigned permanent letters; lighter than air types were identified by the letter Z and heavier than air types by the letter V. The use of letter abbreviations for squadrons was promulgated in the "Naval Aeronautic Organization for Fiscal Year 1923" which is the first known record associating the abbreviated Aircraft Class Designations (V-heavier than air, Z-lighter than air, and letters designating role) with abbreviated squadron designations. In 1948 the Navy established its first two operational helicopter squadrons designating them as Helicopter Utility Squadrons. It departed from the established "V" heavier than air and "Z" lighter than air system and instead gave them the designation "HU" (H-Helicopter, U-Utility).  From that point on heavier than air squadrons which flew rotary wing aircraft were designated with the first letter of "H" while heavier than air squadrons flying fixed wing aircraft retained the original heavier than air "V" then associating the "V" only with fixed wing squadrons. There were two exceptions during the history of Naval Aviation that violated the rule, they were; the use of "RVAH" to denote Reconnaissance Attack Squadrons which operated the RA-5C Vigilante during the 1960s and 1970s and the use of "RVAW" from 1967 to 1983 to designate the Airborne Early Warning (VAW) Fleet Replacement Squadrons.

Electronic Attack (VAQ)

The VAQ designation was established in 1968 to designate "Tactical Electronic Warfare Squadron". On 30 March 1998 the name of the designation was changed to "Electronic Attack Squadron" and all VAQ squadrons then in existence were renamed from "Tactical Electronic Warfare Squadron-" to "Electronic Attack Squadron-".

Electronic Attack Squadrons consists of seven Boeing EA-18G Growlers with the exception of the Fleet Replacement Squadron which has more. The primary mission of the Growler is Electronic Attack (EA), also known as Suppression of Enemy Air Defenses (SEAD) in support of strike aircraft and ground troops by interrupting enemy electronic activity and obtaining tactical electronic intelligence within the combat area. Navy Electronic Attack squadrons carry the letters VAQ (V-fixed wing, A-attack, Q-electronic).

Most VAQ squadrons are carrier based, however a number are "expeditionary", deploying to overseas land bases. When not deployed (either on land or carrier), they are home-ported at NAS Whidbey Island, WA. The exception is VAQ-141, which is forward deployed to MCAS Iwakuni, Japan.

Note: The parenthetical (Second use) and (2nd) appended to some designations in the table below are not a part of the squadron designation system.  They are added to indicate that the designation was used more than once during the history of U.S. Naval Aviation to designate a squadron and that these were the second use of that designation.

Airborne Command & Control (VAW)

The VAW designation was first created in July 1948 with the establishment of VAW-1 and VAW-2 to designate "Carrier Airborne Early Warning Squadron". It was in use for only one month as in August 1948 VAW-1 and VAW-2 were redesignated "Composite Squadron" VC-11 and VC-12. In 1948 the VAW designation was resurrected when VC-11 and VC-12 were redesignated VAW-11 and VAW-12. In 1967, VAW-11 and VAW-12 which were large land based squadrons that provided detachments of Airborne Early Warning aircraft to deploying Carrier Air Wings were redesignated as wings and each of their detachments were established as separate squadrons. Established from VAW-11 were RVAW-110 (a FRS), VAW-111, 112, 113, 114, 115, 116 and established from VAW-12 were RVAW-120 (a FRS), VAW-121, 122, 123. In 2019, the VAW designation was renamed from Carrier Airborne Early Warning Squadron to Airborne Command and Control squadron and all VAW squadrons were renamed “Airborne Command & Control Squadron XXX” while retaining the VAW designation.

Each Carrier Airborne Command and Control squadron consists of four E-2C or five E-2D Hawkeyes except for the Fleet Replacement Squadron which has more. Transition to the E-2D Hawkeye is in progress and should be complete by 2025. The Hawkeye's primary mission is to provide all-weather airborne early warning, airborne battle management and command and control (C2) functions for the carrier strike group and Joint Force Commander. Additional missions include surface surveillance coordination, air interdiction, offensive and defensive counter air control, close air support coordination, time critical strike coordination, search and rescue airborne coordination and communications relay. The E-2 Hawkeye and C-2 Greyhound are built on the same airframe and have many similar characteristics. For this reason, both aircraft are trained for in the same Fleet Replacement Squadron.

When not deployed, they are home-ported at either Naval Station Norfolk, VA or Naval Air Station Point Mugu, CA. The exception is VAW-125, which is forward deployed to MCAS Iwakuni, Japan.

Strike Fighter (VFA)

The VFA designation was created in 1980 to designate "Fighter Attack Squadron". The designation was assigned to squadrons equipped with the new F/A-18A Hornet fighter attack aircraft. In 1983 the designation was changed to "Strike Fighter Squadron" and all VFA squadrons in existence at the time were renamed from "Fighter Attack Squadron-___" to "Strike Fighter Squadron-___". The Marine Corps did not participate in this renaming and VMFA squadrons retain the title "Fighter Attack Squadron". A Strike Fighter Squadron consists of either ten or twelve F/A-18E single seat Super Hornets, twelve F/A-18F two seat Super Hornets or ten F-35C Lightning IIs. Training squadrons (known as Fleet Replacement Squadrons) have many more aircraft. The Hornet and Super Hornet are all-weather aircraft used for attack and fighter missions. In fighter mode, they are used as a fighter escort and for fleet air defense; in attack mode, they are used for force projection, interdiction and close and deep air support. The Hornet and Super Hornet are also used for SEAD and the Super Hornet for aerial refueling.

The F-35C is a fifth-generation strike fighter that was originally planned to replace the F/A-18C Hornet, but expiring F/A-18C service life and delays in F-35C procurement forced the Navy to increase its buy of F/A-18E and F Super Hornets to replace F/A-18C Hornets while awaiting the arrival of the F-35C. The last active component F/A-18C Hornet squadron began its transition to the Super Hornet in February 2019, leaving only a single reserve component F/A-18C Hornet squadron which in 2022 was redesignated a Fighter Composite Squadron and replaced its F/A-18C Hornets with F-5N and F "adversary" aircraft.  The first deployable squadron to transition to the F-35C was a Super Hornet squadron. Ultimately each Carrier Air Wing will be equipped with two Super Hornet squadrons and two F-35C squadrons.

VFA squadrons are home-ported at NAS Lemoore, CA or NAS Oceana, VA when not deployed, except for the squadrons of CVW-5 (which are forward deployed to MCAS Iwakuni, Japan).

Note: The parenthetical (1st), (2nd), (3rd) etc... appended to some designations in the lineage column of table below are not a part of the squadron designation system.  They are added to indicate that the designation was used more than once during the history of U.S. Naval Aviation and which use of the designation is indicated. Absence indicates that the designation was used only once.

Fighter Squadron Composite (VFC)

The VFC designation was created in 1988 when two Fleet Composite (VC) squadrons (VC-12 & 13) which were dedicated adversary squadrons were redesignated to differentiate them from the remaining VC squadrons which fulfilled various miscellaneous or utility roles. In 2006 a third VFC squadron (VFC-111) was established from what had become a permanent detachment of VFC-13 and in 2022 a fourth VFC squadron was created when the last remaining USNR VFA squadron (VFA-204) was redesignated to VFC.  VFC squadrons provide adversary simulation for fleet squadrons. All VFC squadrons are Navy Reserve squadrons.

Two of the squadrons are based at NAS Fallon and NAS Key West to support fleet VFA squadron training at the extensive range complexes supported by those air stations. A third is based at NAS Oceana to support Strike Fighter Wing Atlantic squadron training and the fourth is based at NAS JRB New Orleans.

Note: The parenthetical (2nd) and (3rd) appended to some designations in the lineage column of table below are not a part of the squadron designation system.  They are added to indicate that the designation was used more than once during the history of U.S. Naval Aviation and which use of the designation is indicated. Absence indicates that the designation was used only once.

Patrol and Reconnaissance (VP), Special Projects (VPU), Unmanned Patrol (VUP)

The VP designation is one of the oldest in the U. S. Navy and is the oldest designation currently in use. It first appeared in 1922 to designate "Seaplane Patrol Squadron" and from 1924 it has designated "Patrol Squadron". In 1982 the VPU Patrol Squadron Special Unit designation was created. Maritime patrol aircraft are used primarily for reconnaissance, anti-surface warfare and anti-submarine warfare. Volume 2 of the Dictionary of American Naval Aviation Squadrons contains comprehensive histories over 150 patrol squadrons. Its Appendix 7 details the lineage of every VP, VPB, VP(H), and VP(AM) squadron from 1922 through the late 1990s.

In 2016 the first "Unmanned" Patrol Squadron (VUP) was established. VUP-19 operates the MQ-4C Triton unmanned air vehicle from an operations center located at NAS Jacksonville while its aircraft with aircraft maintenance personnel are deployed around the world as required. A second VUP squadron is programmed for establishment in the future with an operations center at NAS Whidbey Island.

When not deployed VP squadrons are home-ported at NAS Jacksonville, FL or NAS Whidbey Island, WA.

Note: The parenthetical (1st), (2nd), (3rd) and (First use), (Second use) etc... appended to some designations in the table below are not part of the squadron designation system. They are added to indicate that the designation was used more than once during the history of U.S. Naval Aviation and which use of the designation is indicated. Absence indicates that the designation was used only once.

Fleet Air Reconnaissance (VQ)

The VQ designation was created in 1955 to designate "Electronic Countermeasures Squadron" and did so though 1959. By 1960 the VQ squadrons, rather than simply jamming communications and electronic signals, had been equipped to collect them for intelligence purposes. In January 1960 this new role of the VQ squadrons was recognized by changing the VQ designation from "Electronic Countermeasures Squadron" to "Fleet Air Reconnaissance Squadron." Fleet Air Reconnaissance Squadron ONE is currently the Navy's only overt signals intelligence (SIGINT) and communications intelligence (COMINT) reconnaissance squadron. The 13 EP-3E aircraft in the Navy's inventory are based on the Orion P-3 airframe and provide fleet and theater commanders worldwide with near real-time tactical SIGINT and COMINT. With sensitive receivers and high-gain dish antennas, the EP-3E exploits a wide range of electronic emissions from deep within targeted territory.

Fleet Air Reconnaissance Squadrons THREE and FOUR carry the VQ designation, but they are not reconnaissance squadrons; they are airborne command and control, and communications relay squadrons which provide survivable, reliable, and endurable airborne command, control, and communications between the National Command Authority (NCA) and U.S. strategic and non-strategic forces. The squadrons' E-6B aircraft are dual-mission aircraft, capable of fulfilling both the airborne strategic command post mission equipped with an airborne launch control system (ALCS) which is capable of launching U.S. land based intercontinental ballistic missiles and fulfilling the TACAMO ("Take Charge and Move Out") mission which links the NCA with Navy ballistic missile submarine forces during times of crisis. The aircraft carries a very low frequency communication system with dual trailing wire antennae for that communications relay mission.

Fleet Air Reconnaissance Squadron SEVEN is the E-6B Fleet Replacement Squadron, providing initial and requalification training for pilots, aircrewmen, and maintainers.  It operates E-6Bs on loan from VQ-3 and VQ-4, having returned a 737-600 it had previously operated on lease from Lauda Air.

Fleet Logistics Support (VR)

The VR designator was first established in 1942 to designated "Transport" or "Air Transport" or Fleet Logistic Air" squadrons. From 1958 to 1976, it designated "Fleet Tactical Support Squadron"; from 1976 to the present, it designates "Fleet Logistics Support Squadron". Today, all Fleet Logistics Support squadrons are U.S. Navy Reserve squadrons

Fleet Logistics Support Squadrons operate Navy Unique Fleet Essential Airlift (NUFEA) aircraft on a worldwide basis to provide responsive, flexible, and rapidly deployable air logistics support required to sustain combat operations from the sea. During peacetime, squadrons provide air logistics support for all Navy commands as well as provide continuous quality training for mobilization readiness. Fleet Logistics Support squadrons have no counterpart in the Regular Navy. They represent 100% of the Navy's medium and heavy intra-theater airlift, and operate year-round around the world, providing the critical link between deployed seagoing units and air mobility command logistics hubs. VR-1 provides dedicated airlift support to the Office of the Secretary of the Navy, Chief of Naval Operations and Commandant of the Marine Corps.

The Headquarters of the Fleet Logistics Support Wing is based at Naval Air Station Joint Reserve Base Fort Worth, TX, but the squadrons of the wing are based across the country from the east coast to Hawaii. In addition to the VR squadrons, the Fleet Logistics Support Wing also operates two "Executive Transport Detachments" based in Hawaii and Sigonella, Italy.

Note: The parenthetical (2nd), (3rd), or (second use), (third use), etc., appended to some designations in the table below are not part of the squadron designation system. They are added to indicate that the designation was used more than once during the history of U.S. Naval Aviation and which use of the designation is indicated. Absence indicates that the designation was used only once.

Fleet Logistics Support (VRC)

The VRC designation was established in 1960 to designate "Fleet Tactical Support Squadron". In 1976 the designation was changed to "Fleet Logistics Support Squadron."

There are two Fleet Logistic Support squadrons equipped with the C-2A Greyhound Carrier Onboard Delivery (COD) aircraft – one on each coast. VRC-30 is based at Naval Air Station North Island, VRC-40 is based at Naval Station Norfolk. These squadrons send two-plane detachments with each deploying Carrier Air Wing. The C-2A Greyhound, more commonly referred to as a "COD" (short for Carrier onboard delivery), is used to deliver high priority parts, supplies, people, and mail to/from the carrier and shore sites near the carrier operating area.

The E-2 Hawkeye and C-2 Greyhound are built on the same airframe and have many similar characteristics. For this reason, both aircraft are trained for in the same Fleet Replacement Squadron, VAW-120 (see VAW section).

Fleet Logistics Support Squadron 30 (VRC-30)

Fleet Logistics Support Squadron 40 (VRC-40)

Fleet Logistics Multi-Mission (VRM) 

"The CMV-22B Osprey long-range tiltrotor aircraft is the US Navy’s future variant of MV-22B Osprey assault support aircraft developed by Bell Boeing for the US Marine Corps. The medium-lift variant will operate as a carrier on-board delivery (COD) aircraft to meet the logistics support requirements of the Joint Force Maritime Component Commander (JFMCC) during time-critical scenarios. It will replace Northrop Grumman-built C-2A Greyhound cargo aircraft that has been in service with the US Navy since the 1960s. The CMV-22B will be used by the US Navy for transportation of special warfare teams, mail and cargo from shore to its aircraft carriers, as well as for shore or sea-based combat search-and-rescue (CSAR) missions".

The development of the VRM designation and adoption of the CMV-22B demonstrates the Navy's intent to utilize the platform as a means of replacing the carrier-based C-2A Greyhound. This shift in direction has coincided with the formation of the Navy's first VRM squadron, the "Titans" of VRM-30 (The name of which was revived from the "Titans" of HSL-94).

Training (VT)

The VT designation was one of the original designations. It was established in 1921 to designate "Torpedo Plane Squadron". From 1922 to 1930 it designated "Torpedo & Bombing Squadron" and from 1930 to 1946 "Torpedo Squadron". In 1946 all remaining Torpedo Squadrons and Bombing Squadrons (VB) were redesignated "Attack Squadrons" (VA) and the VT designation was retired.

From 1927 to 1947 training squadrons were designated "VN". From 1947 to 1960 training units were not designated as squadrons, they were "units" or "groups" called Basic Training Groups (BTG), Advanced Training Units (ATU), Jet Transition Training Units (JTTU) or Multi Engine Training Groups (METG). On 1 May 1960 the VT designation was resurrected and existing flying training units were designated "Training Squadrons (VT)". There is no relationship between training squadrons designated VT since 1960 and the Torpedo or Torpedo and Bombing squadrons of the 1920s to 1940s.

There are two types of fixed wing training squadrons: Primary training squadrons train students in the first stage of flight training leading to selection to one of three advanced training pipelines for Aviators (Rotary Wing, Strike or Multi-Engine) or two advanced training pipelines for Flight Officers (Multi Crew or Strike). The advanced training squadrons conduct the final stage of flight training leading to "winging" of the new Naval Aviators and Naval Flight Officers in the Navy, Marine Corps, and Coast Guard. Training squadrons are organized differently than the Navy's operational squadrons as training squadrons do not own their own aircraft. All training aircraft are assigned to and maintained by the Training Air Wing to which the squadrons are assigned. The training squadrons are composed only of Instructors and Students, with all maintenance and support functions carried out by the Training Air Wing. Training aircraft are painted orange and white.

Air Test and Evaluation (VX), Scientific Development (VXS)

The VX designation was first used from 1927 to 1943 to designate "Experimental Squadron". It was again used beginning in 1946 when four "Experimental and Development" squadrons (VX-1 (still exists today), 2, 3 and 4) were established to develop and evaluate new equipment and methods. From 1946 to 1968 the designation was variously "Experimental and Development" squadron, "Operational Development" squadron, "Air Operational Development" squadron and "Air Development" squadron.  In 1969 the designation changed to "Air Test and Evaluation" and it remains as such today.

Test and Evaluation squadrons test everything from basic aircraft flying qualities to advanced aerodynamics to weapons systems effectiveness. VX-20, VX-23, VX-30, VX-31 (as well as HX-21 (rotary wing squadron) and UX-24 (UAS squadron)) are developmental test and evaluation squadrons which conduct or support developmental test and evaluation of aircraft and weapons as part of the Naval Air Systems Command (NAVAIRSYSCOM) while VX-1 and VX-9 are operational test and evaluation squadrons which conduct operational test and evaluation of aircraft and weapons as part of the Operational Test and Evaluation Force (OPTEVFOR).

Other Fixed Wing Aircraft Units

Other than the Naval Flight Demonstration Squadron (NFDS) "Blue Angels", the organizations in the table below are not technically "squadrons", however they either have custody of and routinely fly Navy aircraft or they routinely fly aircraft on loan from fleet squadrons for advanced training of those fleet squadrons.

The U.S. Naval Test Pilot School operates various fixed and rotary wing aircraft to train and graduate test pilots and test engineers.

The Navy Fighter Weapons School, Carrier Airborne Early Warning Weapons School and the Airborne Electronic Attack Weapons School train selected U. S. Navy Naval Aviators and Naval Flight Officers (NFO) in instructional techniques and in advanced tactics in their respective aircraft, qualifying them for assignment to their respective wing weapons schools (Strike Fighter Weapons School Lant and Pac, Electronic Attack Weapons School and Airborne Command Control and Logistics School) where they provide advanced training for each wing's squadrons utilizing squadron aircraft.

Rotary Wing Squadrons
US Navy rotary wing squadron designations start with the letter H. The first use of the letter H to designate a helicopter squadron was in 1948 with the establishment of Helicopter Utility Squadrons (HU) ONE and TWO. Prior to the creation of the HU designation, the two basic types of Navy squadrons were "heavier than air" squadrons designated with V as the first letter, and "lighter than air" squadrons designated with Z as the first letter. By 1961 the Navy had disestablished its last lighter than air squadrons leaving only the V and H designations. Since that time V has in practicality become the designation for "fixed wing squadron" and H for "rotary wing squadron." The Navy today uses helicopters primarily in the antisubmarine warfare, antisurface warfare, mine countermeasures, combat search and rescue, special operations, overwater search and rescue, and vertical replenishment roles.

Helicopter Mine Countermeasures (HM)

The HM designation was created in 1971 to designate "Helicopter Mine Countermeasures Squadron". HM Squadrons employ 28 total MH-53E Sea Dragon helicopters. The primary mission of the Sea Dragon is Airborne Mine Countermeasures (AMCM). The MH-53 can operate from aircraft carriers, large amphibious ships and the new expeditionary sea base and is capable of towing a variety of mine hunting/sweeping countermeasures systems.
This gives the Sea Dragon the capability to carry an impressive amount of cargo, personnel or equipment over long distances. The Sea Dragon remains in service as the Navy's only heavy-lift helicopter and only proven mine countermeasure platform. While programmed to replace the USMC's CH-53E and not the Navy's MH-53E, the new Sikorsky CH-53K King Stallion, intended to start flying its evaluations in 2015, has an increased MTOW figure of some 84,700 lb (38,400 kg), some 14,950 lb (6,781 kg) heavier than the Sea Dragon.

The Navy's recently completed "Helicopter Master Plan" was a plan to reduce the number of type/model/series from eight down to two (MH-60R and MH-60S). It recognized that the replacement of the MH-53 in the mine countermeasures role was dependent on technology which has not yet matured. As a result, the MH-53E continues in service as the only helicopter capable now and in the near future of effectively conducting airborne mine countermeasures.

Note: The parenthetical (second use) and (2nd) in the table below are not a part of the squadron designation system. They are added to indicate that the designation was used more than once during the history of U. S. Naval Aviation and which use of the designation is indicated.

Helicopter Sea Combat (HSC)

The Helicopter Sea Combat (HSC) Designation was created in 2005 after the Helicopter Combat Support (HC) squadrons equipped with the H-46 Sea Knight had completed their transitions to the new multi-mission MH-60S Seahawk, and in anticipation of the upcoming transition of the Helicopter Antisubmarine (HS) squadrons from the SH-60F and HH-60H Seahawks to the new MH-60S which began in 2007. The ASW capabilities resident in the HS squadrons were lost in the transition but the new HSC squadrons combine the at sea logistics capability of the former Helicopter Combat Support (HC) squadrons with greatly upgraded Combat Search and Rescue, Naval Special Warfare Support and Anti-Surface Warfare capabilities of the former Helicopter Anti-submarine squadrons (HS).

The HSC squadrons which were formerly HS squadrons are carrier based and deploy as part of a Carrier Air Wing, while the HSC squadrons which were formerly HC squadrons or were newly established are land based "expeditionary" squadrons which supply detachments for deployment aboard ships other than aircraft carriers or for land based deployments as required. The squadrons are home-ported at NS Norfolk, NAS North Island and Anderson AFB, Guam with one squadron forward deployed to NAF Atsugi, Japan. Expeditionary HSC squadrons are capable of deploying mixed detachments of MH-60S and MQ-8B aircraft.

Note: The parenthetical (2nd) used in the lineage column of table below is not a part of the squadron designation system. It is added to indicate that the designation was used more than once during the history of U. S. Naval Aviation and which use of the designation is indicated.

Helicopter Maritime Strike (HSM)

The HSM designation was created in 2006 when the Fleet Replacement Squadron for the MH-60R Seahawk was redesignated from HSL. The new designation was created to reflect the MH-60Rs multi-mission capabilities which combined the area search capabilities of the SH-60B flown by the Helicopter Anti-Submarine Squadron Light (HSL) squadrons with the dipping sonar of the SH-60F flown by the carrier based Helicopter Anti-Submarine (HS) squadrons. The first operational fleet squadron to receive the MH-60 Romeo was HSM-71 in fiscal year 2008. With the transition of the HS squadrons to HSC squadrons without any ASW capability and the disestablishment of the last Air Antisubmarine (VS) squadrons, all ship based airborne ASW capabilities now reside in the new HSM squadrons.

From 2009 to 2015 all Helicopter Anti-Submarine Squadron Light (HSL) squadrons transitioned to the MH-60R and were redesignated Helicopter Maritime Strike (HSM) squadrons. Additionally, new HSM squadrons were established in order to provide an HSM squadron to each Carrier Air Wing and to provide "Expeditionary" squadrons to supply detachments of MH-60Rs to ships other than aircraft carriers. Expeditionary HSM squadrons are capable of deploying mixed detachments of MH-60R and MQ-8B aircraft.

HSM squadrons are home-ported at NAS North Island, NAS Jacksonville, NS Mayport and MCAS Kaneohe Bay with two squadrons forward deployed to NAF Atsugi Japan

Helicopter Training (HT)

The HT designation first appeared in May 1960 to designate Helicopter Training Squadron at the same time that the VT designation was resurrected to designate Training Squadron. In the early years of helicopter operations in the Navy, helicopter pilots were qualified fixed wing pilots who received transition training once they reported to a helicopter squadron. In 1950 a dedicated helicopter training unit was established and in 1960 that unit became the first HT squadron. As the demand for helicopter pilots increased over the decades, additional HT squadrons were established and today approximately 60% of the Student Naval Aviators from all services (Navy, Marine Corps and Coast Guard) are winged as helicopter pilots.

The Naval Air Training Command's Helicopter Training Squadrons provide advanced helicopter flight instruction to all Navy, US Marine Corps, and United States Coast Guard helicopter flight students as well as to international students from several allied nations. Student Naval Aviators are selected for helicopter training after completion of primary flight training in the T-6B in one of the VT squadrons. Students who successfully complete the program earn the right to wear the coveted "Wings of Gold."  and proceed on to their selected aircraft's Fleet Replacement Squadron. Training squadrons are organized differently than the Navy's operational squadrons as training squadrons do not own their own aircraft. All training aircraft are assigned to and maintained by the Training Air Wing to which the squadrons are assigned. The training squadrons are composed only of Instructors and Students, with all maintenance and support functions carried out by the Training Air Wing.

Air Test and Evaluation (HX)
Test and Evaluation squadrons test everything from basic aircraft flying qualities to advanced aerodynamics to weapons systems effectiveness. HX-21 conducts developmental test and evaluation of rotary wing and tilt rotor aircraft and weapons as part of the Naval Air Systems Command (NAVAIRSYSCOM).

Other Rotary Wing Aircraft Units
The organizations in the table below are not technically "squadrons", however they either have custody of and routinely fly Navy aircraft or they routinely fly aircraft on loan from fleet squadrons for advanced training of those fleet squadrons. The Navy Rotary Wing Weapons School trains selected U. S. Navy Naval Aviators in instructional techniques and in advanced tactics for their respective aircraft, qualifying them for assignment to their respective wing weapons schools (Helicopter Sea Combat Weapons School Lant and Pac and Helicopter Maritime Strike Weapons School Lant and Pac) where they provide advanced training for each wing's squadrons utilizing squadron aircraft.

Unmanned Aerial Systems (UAS) Squadrons
The U.S. Navy operates a number of Unmanned Aerial Systems (UAS) utilizing different organizational constructs. The operational MQ-4 Triton is organized into "Unmanned Patrol Squadrons" (VUP) which operate alongside manned "Patrol Squadrons" (VP) utilizing the same administrative and operational command structures for both VP and VUP squadrons (VUP squadrons are listed in the "Fixed Wing Squadrons" section above). MQ-8 Fire Scouts are operated by HSM and HSC squadrons along with the squadrons' MH-60R (HSM) and MH-60S (HSC) aircraft. In April 2018 a new squadron type designation was created apart from the existing "V" for fixed wing squadron and "H" for rotary wing squadron when Air Test and Evaluation Squadron Twenty Four (UX-24) was programmed for establishment to develop unmanned aerial systems (UAS) for the U.S. Navy and Marine Corps. This action created a third squadron type designation of "U".

Air Test and Evaluation (UX)
Test and Evaluation squadrons test everything from basic aircraft flying qualities to advanced aerodynamics to weapons systems effectiveness. UX-24 conducts developmental test and evaluation of fixed wing and rotary wing unmanned aerial systems (UAS) as part of the Naval Air Systems Command (NAVAIRSYSCOM).

See also
 List of United States Navy aircraft wings
 Naval aviation
 List of inactive United States Navy aircraft squadrons
 Modern US Navy carrier air operations
 List of United States Navy aircraft designations (pre-1962) / List of US Naval aircraft
 United States Naval Aviator
 Naval Flight Officer
 United States Marine Corps Aviation
 NATOPS
 List of inactive United States Navy helicopter squadrons
 VBF

Notes

References

 
Aircraft squadrons list
Squadrons
Navy aircraft squadrons
Lists of flying squadrons